The Canton of Rue  is a canton situated in the department of the Somme and in the Hauts-de-France region of northern France.

Geography 
The canton is organised around the commune of Rue in the arrondissement of Abbeville.

Composition
At the French canton reorganisation which came into effect in March 2015, the canton was expanded from 17 to 55 communes:

Ailly-le-Haut-Clocher
Argoules
Arry
Bernay-en-Ponthieu
Le Boisle
Boufflers
Brailly-Cornehotte
Brucamps
Buigny-l'Abbé
Bussus-Bussuel
Cocquerel
Coulonvillers
Cramont
Crécy-en-Ponthieu
Le Crotoy
Dominois
Dompierre-sur-Authie
Domqueur
Ergnies
Estrées-lès-Crécy
Favières
Fontaine-sur-Maye
Fort-Mahon-Plage
Francières
Froyelles
Gorenflos
Gueschart
Ligescourt
Long
Machiel
Machy
Maison-Ponthieu
Maison-Roland
Mesnil-Domqueur
Mouflers
Nampont
Neuilly-le-Dien
Noyelles-en-Chaussée
Oneux
Ponches-Estruval
Pont-Remy
Quend
Regnière-Écluse
Rue
Saint-Quentin-en-Tourmont
Saint-Riquier
Vercourt
Villers-sous-Ailly
Villers-sur-Authie
Vironchaux
Vitz-sur-Authie
Vron 
Yaucourt-Bussus
Yvrench
Yvrencheux

Population

See also
 Arrondissements of the Somme department
 Cantons of the Somme department
 Communes of the Somme department

References

Rue